Rutaparna Panda (born 7 May 1999) is an Indian badminton player from Odisha who was selected to be part of the Indian team for the 2018 Asian Games. Here, she and her partner Arathi Sara Sunil were defeated in the round of 32 by the Thai doubles team. In July 2018, she won the women's doubles title at the All-India senior ranking badminton tournament in Bengaluru. She currently trains at the Hyderabad academy.

Achievements

BWF International Challenge/Series (3 titles, 5 runners-up) 
Women's doubles

Mixed doubles

  BWF International Challenge tournament
  BWF International Series tournament
  BWF Future Series tournament

References

External links
 

Living people
1994 births
People from Cuttack
Racket sportspeople from Odisha
Sportswomen from Odisha
Indian female badminton players
Badminton players at the 2018 Asian Games
Asian Games competitors for India